Moola Chotok (Urdu:) is a hidden ravine located in the middle of the Khuzdar District in the southern province of Balochistan, Pakistan. Surrounded by tall cliffs, the cascading waterfall, known as Chotok, is one of the biggest waterfalls of Sub Tehsil Moola.

History 
Khuzdar was the capital of the Brahui kingdom of Makran.

Ruins of Thore kheer, Hitachi, Harav, Kial Being and Pasta Khan reveal the belonging of Moola to the 2,000-year-old civilisation. Moola River, located in the mountains of Dist Khuzdar, is the largest river of the Khuzdar region that flows throughout the year. It is named after the Moola Village and River, which flows through the length of the valley. The valley is home to several mountain ranges, salt mines, lakes and waterfalls.

Demography 
Jahan is one of the most beautiful villages of Sub Tehsil Moola. The population is estimated to be over 20,000. The local language of Moola Chotok is Brahui.

Weather 
In summer, it is one of the hottest places in the country like Sibi and Dhadar. In winter, it is one of the coldest places. Temperatures vary wildly throughout the year, with summer highs commonly exceeding 120 °F (48.9 °C) and winter minimum temperatures sometimes falling below freezing point. Weather conditions can greatly affect hiking and valley exploration, and visitors should obtain accurate forecasts because of hazards posed by exposure to extreme temperatures and late summer monsoons.

See also 
 Chotok Waterfalls
 List of districts of Balochistan

References

External links 
Moola Chotok - Khuzdar Dawn Newspaper
Moola Chotok - A Hidden Paradise of Balochistan

Tourist attractions in Balochistan, Pakistan
Khuzdar District
Ravines